Ledina Alolli was a member of the Assembly of the Republic of Albania for the Democratic Party of Albania.

References

Year of birth missing (living people)
Living people
Democratic Party of Albania politicians
Place of birth missing (living people)
21st-century Albanian politicians
21st-century Albanian women politicians
Members of the Parliament of Albania
Women members of the Parliament of Albania